Sabatia is a genus of sea snails, marine gastropod molluscs in the family Scaphandridae, the canoe bubbles.

Species
 Sabatia bathymophila (Dall, 1881)
 † Sabatia isseli Bellardi, 1877 
 Sabatia japonica Habe, 1952
 Sabatia nivea (R. B. Watson, 1883)
 Sabatia pustulosa Dall, 1895
 Sabatia pyriformis Valdés, 2008
 Sabatia robusta (Okutani, 1966)
Synonyms
 Sabatia ovata Habe, 1952: synonym of Alacuppa supracancellata (Schepman, 1913)
 Sabatia planetica (Dall, 1908): synonym of Scaphander planeticus Dall, 1908
 Sabatia supracancellata (Schepman, 1913): synonym of Alacuppa supracancellata (Schepman, 1913)

References

  Valdés, Á. (2008). Deep-sea "cephalaspidean" heterobranchs (Gastropoda) from the tropical southwest Pacific. In: Héros, V. et al. (eds) Tropical Deep-Sea Benthos 25. Mémoires du Muséum national d'Histoire naturelle. 196: 587-792.

External links
 Bellardi, L. (1877 ("1876") ). Descrizione di un nuovo genera della famiglia delle Bullide fossile del terreno pliocenico inferior del Piemonte e della Liguria. Bullettino della Società Malacologica Italiana. 2: 207-210
 Siegwald, J., Oskars, T. R., Kano, Y. & Malaquias, M. A. E. (2022). A global phylogeny of the deep-sea gastropod family Scaphandridae (Heterobranchia: Cephalaspidea): Redefinition and generic classification. Molecular Phylogenetics and Evolution. 169: 107415

Scaphandridae